De Gregorio, DeGregorio, Di Gregorio and DiGregorio are surnames. Note that in some entries listed below, Gregorio is considered the surname. People so named include:

People
 Alex Di Gregorio (born 1962), Italian editorial cartoonist and author
 Alexandre Di Gregorio (born 1980), Belgian footballer
 Baldo di Gregorio (born 1984), German football manager and player
 Diego de Gregorio (born 1986), Chilean footballer
 Emanuele Di Gregorio (born 1980), Italian sprinter
 Emmanuele de Gregorio (1758–1839), Italian Catholic cardinal, son of Leopoldo de Gregorio
 Ernie DiGregorio (born 1951), American former National Basketball Association player
 Gaspar DiGregorio (1905–1970), New York mobster
 Gianni Di Gregorio (born 1949), Italian director, screenwriter and actor
 Giovanni De Gregorio (1579 or 1580–1656), better known as il Pietrafesa, painter from Satriano di Lucania
 Giovanni De Gregorio (cardinal) (1729–1791)
 Javier di Gregorio (born 1977), Chilean football goalkeeper
 Jerry DeGregorio (born 1962), American basketball coach
 Joel DiGregorio (1944–2011), keyboardist for the Charlie Daniels Band
 José de Gregorio (born 1959), Chilean economist, Governor of the Central Bank of Chile from 2007 to 2011
 Leoncio Alonso González de Gregorio, 22nd Duke of Medina Sidonia (born 1956), Spanish historian
 Leopoldo de Gregorio, Marquis of Squillace (1699–1785), Italian statesman, minister of King Charles III of Spain
 Marco de Gregorio (1829–1876), Italian painter
 Matías Di Gregorio (born 1986), Argentine footballer
 Michael DiGregorio (born 1990), Filipino-Italian Philippine Basketball Association player
 Michele Di Gregorio (born 1997), Italian footballer
 Pascual de Gregorio (born 1972), Chilean football manager and former player, older brother of Diego de Gregorio
 Pilar González de Gregorio (born 1957), Spanish socialite, sister of the 22nd Duke of Medina Sidonia
 Raf de Gregorio (born 1977), New Zealand footballer
 Rémy Di Gregorio (born 1985), French road bicycle racer
 Ron DeGregorio, American ice hockey executive, president of USA Hockey from 2003 to 2015
 Sergio De Gregorio (disambiguation), several people

Fictional characters
  Charlene "Cha Cha" DiGregorio, in the musical Grease

See also
 Palazzo Di Gregorio, a building in Alcamo, Sicily